Turiisk Raion was a raion in Volyn Oblast in western Ukraine. Its administrative center was the urban-type settlement of Turiisk. The raion was abolished and its territory was merged into Kovel Raion on 18 July 2020 as part of the administrative reform of Ukraine, which reduced the number of raions of Volyn Oblast to four. The last estimate of the raion population was  According to the 2001 Census, the population was 29,043.

See also
 Administrative divisions of Volyn Oblast
 Trisk (Hasidic dynasty)

References

External links
 turadm.gov.ua 

Former raions of Volyn Oblast
1965 establishments in Ukraine
Ukrainian raions abolished during the 2020 administrative reform